The Bundesstraße 17 (abbr. B17) is a German federal highway, running some 110 kilometres from Gersthofen to the Austrian border near Füssen, along the Lech river. From north to south; it passes through cities such as Augsburg, Landsberg am Lech, Schongau, Peiting, Steingaden and Schwangau.

It corresponds to a long portion of the Romantic Road and overlaps the ancient Roman road Via Claudia Augusta.

References

Roads in Bavaria
0017